The Tottenham Thunder are a Canadian junior ice hockey team based in Tottenham, Ontario.  They play in the Greater Metro Junior A Hockey League (GMHL). The team was known as the Tottenham Steam for its first six seasons.

History
The Tottenham Steam joined the Greater Metro Junior A Hockey League (GMHL) in 2014.  Their first general manager and head coach was Ryan Wood. The Steam played their first game, at home, on September 6, 2014.  Hosting the Russell Cup champions Bradford Bulls, winning 7–5. The first goal in team history was scored by Brian Rupp after 3:44 into the first period.

Shortly after winning their first Russell Cup championship in 2016, the Tottenham Steam gained new owners in the DaSilva family. Cup-winning coach Ryan Wood left the team to take the same positions with the New Tecumseth Civics. The DaSilva's initially brought in Johan Moell as general manager and Jim Aldred as head coach for the 2016–17 season but would instead hire former NHL All-Star Dennis Maruk as head coach. However, Maruk had to take a leave of absence midseason and was replaced by Brandon Billie. For the 2017–18 season, the Steam brought in Matt Hamilton as head coach and general manager after previously coaching the Bradford Rattlers.

The 2018–19 season saw the Steam add Robert Babiak as general manager, coming off a season with the Port Huron Prowlers. Babiak would depart the team in January, with the team then trading away many of its key players. Following the 2018–19 season, the DaSilva's sold the team to new ownership, which retained Hamilton as general manager and head coach.

Following the 2019–20 season, Matt Hamilton becoming the sole owner of the team. The team briefly rebranded as the Tottenham Express for a fresh start in April 2020. Derek Robinson became head coach with Matt Hamilton acting as general manager and president. The 2020–21 season was delayed due to the COVID-19 pandemic restrictions and the team rebranded again as the Tottenham Thunder in November 2020.

Season-by-season standings

Team captains
Braedan Foote 2014–15 
Kevin Walker 2015–16
Hayden Way 2016–17

References

External links
 Official Website

2014 establishments in Ontario
Ice hockey clubs established in 2014
Ice hockey teams in Ontario
Sport in Simcoe County